Wojciech Belon (March 14, 1952 in Kwidzyn – May 3, 1985 in Kraków), also known as Wojtek Bellon, was a Polish poet, songwriter and folksinger. His best known ballad Majster Bieda (Master Poor) and most of his compositions have never been released by government controlled media which at that time was dominated by establishment approved songwriters such as Agnieszka Osiecka, though most college students and Polish youth knew them by heart from amateur tapes recorded at student and tourist festivals and similar musical events in Cracow 1974, Zielona Góra 1985, Busko Zdrój, Tarnów, Gdańsk. In Poland you can hear them until this very day as part of the repertoire of many bands. Belon was a symbol of youth frustration of the so-called lost generation of the late-1960s, 1970s and early-1980s in Poland. His writings were inspiring in the way Bob Dylan's songs in America were. The circumstances of his death in 1985 have never been disclosed.

References

Bibliography
 SLM Ballada – biography (Polish)
 Stachuriada – poetry (Polish)
  – music (by a band formed originally by Belon himself) 
  – music (by a Boys Scouts group)

1952 births
1984 deaths
Polish songwriters
Sung poetry of Poland
People from Kwidzyn
Polish folk singers
20th-century Polish poets
20th-century Polish male singers